The Continental CAE T51 was a small turboshaft engine produced by Continental Aviation and Engineering (CAE) under license from Turbomeca. A development of the Artouste, it was followed by three additional turboshaft engines, the T72, the T65, and the T67. However, none of these engines, including the T51, entered full production. CAE abandoned turboshaft development in 1967 after the XT67 lost to the Pratt & Whitney Canada PT6T (T400) to power the Bell UH-1N Twin Huey.

Variants and derivatives

XT51-1 (Model 210) Based on the Turbomeca Artouste I; 280 shp.
XT51-3 (Model 220-2) Based on the Turbomeca Artouste II; 425 shp.
XT72 (Model 217-5) Based on the Turbomeca Astazou; 600 shp.
XT65 (Model 217-10) A scaled-down version of the Astazou; competed against the Allison T63 to power the Light Observation Helicopter; 305 shp.
T65-T-1
XT67  (Model 217A) two engines driving a common gearbox; based on the Turbomeca Astazou X and T72; 1,540 shp.
Model 210Company designation for the XT51-1
Model 217-5Company designation for the XT72
Model 217-10Company designation for the XT65
Model 217ACompany designation for the XT67
Model 217A-2ACompany designation for the T67-T-1
Model 219similar to 220-2 with extra axial compressor stage
Model 220-2Company designation for the XT51-3
Model 227-4ACompany designation for the T65-T-1
Model TS325-1Alternative company designation for the T65-T-1
Model 327-5Turboprop version of the T65-T-1

Applications

XT51-1
 XL-19C Bird Dog
 Sikorsky XH-39 (S-59)
XT51-3
 Bell 201 (XH-13F)
XT67
 Bell 208
XT72
 Republic Lark (license-built Aérospatiale Alouette II)

Specifications (XT51-3)

See also

References

Further reading

External links
 Turbomeca website

1950s turboshaft engines
T51